The 1977–78 Scottish League Cup was the thirty-second season of Scotland's second football knockout competition. The competition was won by Rangers, who defeated Celtic in the Final.

First round

First Leg

Second Leg

Second round

First Leg

Second Leg

Third round

First Leg

Second Leg

Quarter-finals

First Leg

Second Leg

Semi-finals

Final

References

General

Specific

League Cup
Scottish League Cup seasons